Route 615 is a  long east–west secondary highway in the eastern portion of New Brunswick, Canada.

The route starts at Route 610 in Upper Caverhill northeast of the town of Nackawic. The road travels southeast through a mostly forested area to the communities of Lower Caverhill, Springfield, Scotch Settlement, and Jewetts Mills. Continuing, the road ends at Route 105 in Mactaquac on the west bank of the Mactaquac Basin close to the Mactaquac Dam.

History

See also

References

615
615